Rieux-Volvestre (before June 2009: Rieux;) is a commune in Haute-Garonne department in southwestern France. Prior to 2009, it was known as Rieux.

History
Rieux Cathedral, which is located here, was the seat of the Ancien Régime diocese of Rieux, created in 1317 and dissolved in 1790.

In 1560, Rieux-Volvestre was the site of the trial of Arnaud du Tilh, in the Martin Guerre case of imposture.

The commune of Rieux was renamed to Rieux-Volvestre in 2009, which is written by a decision.

Population
The inhabitants of the commune are known as Rivois or Rivoises.

Twin towns
Rieux-Volvestre is twinned with:
 Font-rubí, Spain

See also
Communes of the Haute-Garonne department

References

External links

 Picture of Rieux Cathedral

Communes of Haute-Garonne